Indian Creek is a major stream in the northern Sierra Nevada of Plumas County, California and is part of the Feather River system.

It flows southeast into Antelope Lake, a reservoir impounded by Antelope Valley Dam. Below the dam it flows south to its confluence with Last Chance Creek, then flows west through the Genesee Valley and the town of Genesee. It turns north, passing through Indian Valley, where it receives Lights Creek and Wolf Creek and passes a few miles south of Greenville, then flows southwest past Indian Falls, where it joins Spanish Creek to form the East Branch North Fork Feather River.

SR 89 follows the lower part of Indian Creek and is known as the "Scenic Byway Link", connecting the Feather River National Scenic Byway (SR 70 west of Quincy) to the Volcanic Legacy National Scenic Byway (toward Lassen Volcanic National Park). The area provides recreational opportunities including fishing, bicycling and viewing fall colors.

See also
List of rivers of California

References

Rivers of Plumas County, California